Gary Norman Hurring (born 10 October 1961 in Auckland) is a former swimmer from New Zealand, who won the gold medal at the 1978 Commonwealth Games in the men's 200 metres backstroke. He gained silver in the same event at the 1978 World Aquatics Championships.

Hurring was considered a possible medallist for the 1980 Summer Olympics but was denied the opportunity due to the boycott by the majority of New Zealand Olympic sports associations. At the 1984 Summer Olympics he just missed medals in both backstroke events finishing fourth in the 100m and fifth in the 200m.

Hurring was appointed New Zealand swim team coach at the 2012 Summer Olympics.

Hurring is the son of two former Olympic backstroke swimmers, Lincoln Hurring and Jean Stewart; his mother won the bronze medal in the women's 100 metres backstroke at the 1952 Summer Olympics in Helsinki, Finland.

See also
 List of Commonwealth Games medallists in swimming (men)

References 

1961 births
Living people
New Zealand male backstroke swimmers
New Zealand swimming coaches
New Zealand Olympic coaches
Olympic swimmers of New Zealand
Swimmers at the 1978 Commonwealth Games
Commonwealth Games gold medallists for New Zealand
Swimmers at the 1984 Summer Olympics
Swimmers from Auckland
World Aquatics Championships medalists in swimming
Commonwealth Games medallists in swimming
20th-century New Zealand people
21st-century New Zealand people
Medallists at the 1978 Commonwealth Games